Jalaluddin Shar is a small village located in Taluka Faiz Ganj of Khairpur district, Sindh province, Pakistan.  It is located near the town Bhangu Behan. 

Populated places in Khairpur District